Andrzej Głownia (born 9 November 1951) was a Polish footballer who played as a forward.

Biography

Głownia started his career with Lechia Gdańsk in 1969, making his debut in the team on 12 October 1969 in the 8–0 win against Gwardia Koszalin. This proved to be his only appearance during his first spell with Lechia, joining Flota Gdynia the season after. While at Flota the team were involved in a friendly with Widzew Łódź who expressed an interest in Głownia after the match, however Głownia stated that the only club he wished to play for was with Lechia, a situation that was realised in 1972 when he returned to the club. During his second spell with Lechia he played 8 seasons in the II liga, making a total of 204 appearances in the league during this time. In all competitions over his two spells with Lechia, Głownia made 217 appearances and scored 28 goals. In 1980 Głownia was given the chance to play in the I liga with Arka Gdynia. This was his only season with Arka, making 9 appearances and scoring 1 goal in Poland's top division. At the end of the 1980–81 season Głownia retired from playing. At the end of his playing career Głownia became a newsagent.

References

1951 births
Lechia Gdańsk players
Arka Gdynia players
Polish footballers
Association football forwards
Living people